Opostegoides index is a moth of the family Opostegidae. It was described by Edward Meyrick in 1922. It is known from Assam in India.

Adults have been recorded in July.

References

Opostegidae
Moths described in 1922